Coastal Transitional Center is a minimum security prison located in Savannah, Georgia in Chatham County, Georgia. The facility houses adult male felons; the capacity is 200. It was constructed in 1940 and was renovated in 2003.
It has 44 living units ranging in size from four to 12 beds.

The mission of Coastal Transitional Center is to protect the community while assisting residents in making a successful transition back into society. It provides social and employment skills in a structured environment. Coastal State Prison, located in Garden City, Georgia, is the host facility for the transitional center.

The transitional center features long-term maintenance residents assigned as permanent workers in Food Service, Maintenance, Lawn Care, Laundry Services, Sanitation, Barbering, and details for other government facilities, while the remaining residents participate in the work release program.

References

External links
Georgia Department of Corrections

Government buildings in Savannah, Georgia
Prisons in Georgia (U.S. state)
1940 establishments in Georgia (U.S. state)